Francesco Bettella is an Italian Paralympic swimmer. He represented Italy at the Summer Paralympics in 2012, 2016 and 2021.

Career
In 2016, he won two medals: the silver medal both in the men's 50 metre backstroke S1 event and in the men's 100 metre backstroke S1 event. He won two bronze medals at the 2020 Summer Paralmpics.

He won the bronze medal in the men's 50 metres backstroke S2 at the 2018 World Para Swimming European Championships held in Dublin, Ireland.

References

External links 
 

Living people
Year of birth missing (living people)
Place of birth missing (living people)
Italian male backstroke swimmers
Swimmers at the 2012 Summer Paralympics
Swimmers at the 2016 Summer Paralympics
Swimmers at the 2020 Summer Paralympics
Medalists at the 2016 Summer Paralympics
Medalists at the 2020 Summer Paralympics
Paralympic silver medalists for Italy
Paralympic bronze medalists for Italy
Paralympic medalists in swimming
Paralympic swimmers of Italy
Medalists at the World Para Swimming Championships
Medalists at the World Para Swimming European Championships
S1-classified Paralympic swimmers
21st-century Italian people